Senator Nicholson may refer to:

Alfred O. P. Nicholson (1808–1876), U.S. Senator from Tennessee from 1840 to 1842; also served in the Tennessee State Senate
Donald W. Nicholson (1888–1968), Massachusetts State Senate
Elwyn Nicholson (1923–2014), Louisiana State Senate
Floyd Nicholson (born 1949), South Carolina Senate
Jeanne Nicholson (born 1952), Colorado State Senate
Samuel D. Nicholson (1859–1921), U.S. Senator from Colorado from 1921 to 1923